Albert Christian Vigfusson Deildal (May 8, 1894 – October 19, 1971) was a Canadian professional ice hockey player.

Deildal played for the Victoria Senators in the Victoria City Senior League from 1920 until 1922. Deildal joined the Victoria Cougars of the Pacific Coast Hockey Association for one game in the 1922–23 season.

References

1894 births
1971 deaths
Canadian ice hockey right wingers
Ice hockey people from Manitoba
Victoria Cougars (1911–1926) players